Cudgewa was a railway station on the Cudgewa railway line in Cudgewa, Victoria, Australia.  It was 410.249 km from Southern Cross station. A disused paddock is all that is left where this station was once located.

The turntable and passenger platform were abolished in 1976.

References

Disused railway stations in Victoria (Australia)
Shire of Towong